Oirata poculidactyla is a moth of the family Pterophoridae. It is found in Russia (the Altai Mountains).

References

Moths described in 2001
Pterophorini
Moths of Asia